The 1914 North Carolina A&M Aggies football team represented the North Carolina A&M Aggies of North Carolina College of Agriculture and Mechanic Arts during the 1914 college football season. The team was a member of the South Atlantic Intercollegiate Athletic Association.

Schedule

References

North Carolina AandM
NC State Wolfpack football seasons
North Carolina AandM Aggies football